Cupid plc was the owner and operator of multiple high-volume online dating websites, covering the range from mainstream to niche audiences. The full network of websites is available worldwide in a variety of languages, and by the end of the first half of 2012 more than 54 million users had created profiles in the company's websites. As is customary among all internet dating companies, all of their products are available across multiple devices (web, mobile, Android, iOS) and platforms (on web browsers, within Facebook).

History

Founded in 2005 by Bill Dobbie and Max Polyakov, the company was originally made up of a range of dating websites operated from an off-shore base. In 2006, Polyakov and Dobbie acquired the EasyDate business and brand to complement and serve as an umbrella for their network of sites, which had been experiencing a steady growth in user base. The company quickly grew its user base – by 2007 they had their first million paying users, and a few years after that they hit an impressive 13 million paying users across all networks.

By early March 2010, the user base was growing at a rate of 300,000 per month, and new products were succeeding in increasing these numbers and expanding the user base. A year later, in May 2011, the company boasted 23 million members in 39 countries. The company was named as Scotland's fastest growing technology firm by Deloitte in its October 2011 Fast 500 listing, and in May 2012, went on to be awarded the UK Stock Market Awards 2012 award for Best Travel & Leisure PLC.

This success, and the desire to fund further growth, prompted the company to become listed in the Alternative Investment Market of the London Stock Exchange (AIM). Upon admission, the company had an approximate market capitalisation of £45 million. The fresh capital brought about by the listing enabled the company to perform some strategic acquisitions in markets where it had detected potential, like France, Germany, the US, and Brazil. On 24 July 2012, Cupid plc announced that it had acquired the French dating site Assistance Genie Logiciel (AGL) for the sum of €3.7 million. The deal to buy the 1986-founded company includes French dating sites amour.com, serencontrer.com and ulla.com. Also in 2012 Cupid acquired Uniform Dating, a niche website aimed at uniformed services personnel such as firefighters, nurses, armed forces and police.

BBC investigation

In February 2013, the company was the subject of BBC Radio 5live Investigates programme. Users told the BBC that they had received many messages from potential dates as free users of the site but that, when they paid for membership to be able to reply, the volume of messages dramatically decreased. The company denied that it was sending the messages to entice users to pay for membership and has commissioned an independent audit into its operation. After a subsequent investigation into these claims, one of the sources of the accusations made a public apology regarding factual inaccuracies in his blog postings on the subject.

Investigation by Ukrainian newspaper Kyiv Post in March 2013 proved usage of fake profiles by the company and confirmed that the company's 'social media managers', whose job was to tempt users, were actually located in Ukraine. It was revealed that only about 20 employees of Cupid plc actually worked in the United Kingdom, and around 1500 staff members were located in Ukraine.

The company stated that its auditors KPMG had found 'no evidence of a company organised practice of staff enticing registered members to subscribe through the use of fake profiles'. Nevertheless, Cupid recognized that existing staff profiles 'were not clearly identifiable' to users and said it had replaced the motivation teams with dating advisors. In July 2013, BBC published new investigation, claiming that problem of fake profiles still existed, and the company used real persons' data without their knowledge.

Such kind of semi-legal activities is a subject to legal prosecution in some countries. Björn and Benjamin Bak, founders of German dating application Lovoo, and twelve members of their staff were arrested and accused of commercial deception because of using similar scheme. Avid Life Media, founder of dating site Ashley Madison, was accused of using 'fembots' on a large scale. British-based JDI Dating Ltd was fined by US Federal Trade Commission for using fake profiles.

Business and products
Cupid's business can be split into two main areas: mainstream dating websites, aimed at the general public with some level of differentiation between them (for example, Cupid.com is aimed at people looking for a steady partner in a more long-term relationship, whereas BeNaughty.com is geared towards users looking for more casual dating); and niche websites, where the whole concept fundamentally hinges on the users looking for partners of a similar background and tastes.

The business model varies slightly depending on the website. In most cases, users can join for free – this gives them access to the website and allows them to browse the profiles of other users. Once they are ready to begin interacting with someone, the website charges depending on the level of access the user wants. This is a fairly common practice across the industry. Cupid makes most of their business through the charging of these fees, as there is no advertising on their websites.

In addition to this, Cupid also partners with other companies in order to provide a branded, specifically targeted online dating experience.

Cupid plc disposed of its casual dating sites in July 2013. It sold the remaining mainstream dating sites to NSI Holdings Ltd. in December 2014 and is no longer involved in online dating.

Name change
The company had been trading as EasyDate since 2006, when it acquired the name. Because of this, it was under that name that it became initially listed in the markets (as EasyDate plc). However, in December 2010, as a result of pressure from easyGroup founder Sir Stelios Haji-Ioannou, the company changed its name. The name Cupid plc was chosen as it had been acquired in September of that year, along with all associated domains for £4.4 million.

End of Cupid plc
The investigations by BBC and Kyivpost caused a sharp decline in the share prices. In Summer 2013, the company sold part of its 'casual dating business' to Grendall Investment Limited, controlled by co-founder and shareholder of Cupid plc Max Polyakov.

In 2014, Cupid plc suffered heavy losses and was forced to call in part of money owed by Grendall. The company preferred to take a reduced £12,5 million instead of around £20 million to get it a year earlier. Late Cupid plc announced that it sold final dating businesses for just £3 million. It is believed that assets were bought by the companies connected to Max Polyakov. Cupid plc was renamed Castle Street Investment and realigned as an investment company.

See also
 Cupid.com
 Badoo
 eHarmony
 Cupid Media
 HitDynamics, another company founded by Max Polyakov
 Match.com
 Zoosk

References

  OPW - Interview with Cupid Ceo Phil Gripton, 19 September 2013]

Online dating services of the United Kingdom
2005 establishments in Scotland